The 2021–22 Donar season was the 50th season in the existence of the club. The club played its first season in the BNXT League, a newly established league which combines the Belgian and Dutch national leagues.

Overview 
This was the first season under newly hired head coach Matthew Otten, who came over from Yoast United. Otten returned to Donar after playing a on the championship team in 2010. Along with Otten, star point guard Austin Luke came over from United. Additionally, Donar recruited five new foreign players. The team managed to qualify for the regular season after it finished in second place in the qualifying tournament hosted at MartiniPlaza. In the regular season, Donar failed to advance after taking big losses against London Lions and Medi Bayreuth. 

In the BNXT League season, Donar stumbled in the first quarter of the season with an opening day loss against Aris Leeuwarden. In early November, two new foreign players were signed in Donte Thomas and Jimmy Gavin. Donar ended the year 2021 with two losses against ZZ Leiden and Yoast United.

On 20 March 2022, Donar won its seventh national Basketball Cup after defeating Heroes Den Bosch in the final, which was played in the MartiniPlaza. In the national playoffs, Donar was swept 0-3 by Heroes. In the BNXT Play-offs, they reached the finals where they lost to ZZ Leiden over two games.

Players

Squad information

Depth chart

Players with multiple nationalities

Transactions

In 

|}

Out

|}

Preseason

BNXT League

Domestic Phase

Standings

Results
Due to the COVID-19 pandemic in the Netherlands, games had to be played behind closed doors from 12 November. Multiple games were re-scheduled to later dates.

Elite Gold

Standings

Results

Dutch Playoffs

Quarterfinals

Semifinals

BNXT Playoffs

Third Round

Fourth Round

Quarterfinals

Semifinals

Finals

Basketball Cup

On 20 March 2022, Donar won its seventh Dutch Basketball Cup title, tying the record held by Heroes Den Bosch for cup most titles.

Eightfinals

Quarterfinals

Semifinals

Final

FIBA Europe Cup

Qualification tournament
Donar played in the qualification tournament for the 2021–22 FIBA Europe Cup, and was also awarded to host the tournament. Donar lost the final of the qualification to Benfica, but advanced as a Lucky Loser.

Qualification semifinal

Qualification final

Regular season
Donar was drawn into Group A of the regular season, where it faced three opponents which it never faced before.

Statistics 
Source:

BNXT League

Notes

References

External links 
 Donar website

Donar (basketball club)
Donar
2021–22 FIBA Europe Cup
Donar (basketball club) seasons